Oakden, Addison and Kemp was an Australian architectural firm in Melbourne, Victoria. While it was short lived, existing from only 1887 to 1892, they designed a number of outstanding projects, and all three members designed many more notable projects in earlier and later partnerships.

The firm began as Terry & Oakden, a partnership of architects Percy Oakden (1845-1917) and the prolific Leonard Terry from 1874 until Terry's death in 1884.George Henry Male Addison and Henry Hardie Kemp then joined in 1887, creating Oakden, Addison & Kemp. Addison, who had started a Brisbane branch in 1889 left in 1892, leaving Oakden and Kemp practicing until Kemp moved to Sydney in 1895, dissolving the partnership in 1896.

In 1900 Oakden took on Cedric Henry Ballantyne to become Oakden & Ballantyne, until Oakden died in 1917.

One of the earliest projects was North Park, a large mansion for Alexander McCracken, of McCracken's Brewery, completed in 1888, which was amongst Melbourne's first examples of the Queen Anne style. The firm then took on the design of Australia's first skyscraper (together with John Beswicke), the 12 storey Australian Property Investment Co. Building (later known as the APA building) in Elizabeth Street, amongst the tallest in the world in 1889, it remained Australia's tallest until 1912, and Melbourne's tallest until 1929. It was also designed in the new Queen Anne fashion, the tall spikes and spires of the roof adding to its verticality. The next year they designed the more conventional, but still tall, premises for the Young Men's Christian Association headquarters, with its mansard roofs and internal hall. The YMCA never occupied it, due to the financial crash of the 1890s, which also curtailed the work of the firm, and soon lost Addison as a partner in 1892 to establish a practice in Brisbane.

List of works

Percy Oakden
1870: Ballarat Town Hall, Sturt Street, Ballarat (final overall composition by Oakden)
1872: Wesleyan Church, Sydney Road, Brunswick
1873: Clunes Town Hall and Court House, Bailey Street, Clunes
1887: St Albans Village Plan Precinct, Victoria and Albert Crescents, St Albans

Terry & Oakden
1874: Former Methodist Church, Church Street, Fitzroy North
1875: Former Australia and New Zealand Bank (ANZ) building, 49-51 Reid Street, Wangaratta.
1876: Ercildoune, Napier Street, Footscray
1881: Front addition to town house, Gipps Street, East Melbourne
1883: Francis Ormond Building, Workingmen's College (first stage), La Trobe Street, Melbourne
1884: Former English, Scottish and Australian Bank, Alexander Road, Ascot Vale
1887: Queens College, Melbourne University

Oakden, Addison & Kemp

1887: Former Wesleyan Church and Manse, 21 -23 Highbury Grove, Kew
1888: Grosvenor Chambers, 9 Collins St, Melbourne
1888: North Park, Woodland Street, Essendon
1888: South Australian Insurance Building (originally New Zealand Chambers), Collins Street, Melbourne
1888: Wesleyan Church, Hesse Street, Queenscliff
1889: ANZ Bank Building, Fitzroy North
1889: ANZ Bank, Napier Street, St Arnaud
1889: former London Chartered Bank, 370-74 Queens Parade, Fitzroy North 
1889: Australian Property Investment Co. Building, Elizabeth Street, Melbourne (with John Beswicke)
1889: Thomas Gaggin House, Alma Road, Camberwell
1889: Dr Thomas Rowan House, Alton Road, Mount Macedon (demolished)
1890: former YMCA (now Salvation Army Temple), Bourke Street, Melbourne
1890: Terrace House, 16 Jolimont Terrace, East Melbourne
1890-92: Francis Ormond Building, Workingmen's College (second stage), La Trobe Street, Melbourne

Oakden & Ballantyne
1901: Ivanhoe Metropolitan Fire Station,  Upper Heidelberg Road, Ivanhoe
1901: The Wilderness Homestead Second House, Wilderness Road, Gritjurk
1910: Hawthorn Fire Station, William Street, Hawthorn
1910: New Zealand Loan and Mercantile Company Ltd Building, Collins Street, Melbourne

References

Further reading
Lewis, Miles (December, 1977) Architectural Drawings As Historical Sources in The La Trobe Journal, No. 20, pp: 69-89 (The Friends of the La Trobe Library) ISSN 0041-3151

Architecture firms based in Victoria (Australia)
Companies based in Melbourne